Vincent Joseph Polistina (born June 10, 1971) is an American Republican politician who has served in the New Jersey Senate since 2021. He previously served in the New Jersey General Assembly, where he represented the 2nd Legislative District from 2008 to 2012.

Early life and education
A lifelong resident of Atlantic County, Polistina grew up in Galloway Township and graduated from Absegami High School in 1989.

Polistina received a B.A. from Rutgers University with a major in Bioenvironmental Engineering. He is owner of the engineering firm of Polistina and Associates, L.L.C.

He lives in Egg Harbor Township with his wife Carolyn and their three children.

Elective office
Polistina ran for the New Jersey Senate in the 2nd district in 2011, losing to incumbent Democrat Jim Whelan in the state's most expensive race, with more than $3 million spent by both candidates. His Assembly seat was filled by Chris A. Brown.

The Republican Party chose Polistina in July to fill the vacant Senate seat, but he was not sworn into the Senate until November 8, 2021. Polistina was also elected to fill the full term of office beginning in January 2022, defeating Democratic state Assemblyman Vince Mazzeo.

Committees 
Committee assignments for the current session are:
Higher Education
State Government, Wagering, Tourism & Historic Preservation

District 2 
Each of the 40 districts in the New Jersey Legislature has one representative in the New Jersey Senate and two members in the New Jersey General Assembly. The representatives from the 2nd District for the 2022—23 Legislative Session are:
Senator Vincent J. Polistina (R)
Assemblyman Don Guardian (R)
Assemblyman Claire Swift (R)

Election history

References

External links
Senator Polistina's legislative web page, New Jersey Legislature
New Jersey Legislature financial disclosure forms
2010 2009 2008 2007

1971 births
Living people
Absegami High School alumni
Republican Party members of the New Jersey General Assembly
Republican Party New Jersey state senators
People from Egg Harbor Township, New Jersey
People from Galloway Township, New Jersey
Politicians from Atlantic County, New Jersey
Rutgers University alumni
21st-century American politicians